A hyperplastic polyp is a type of colorectal polyp.

Cancer risk
Most hyperplastic polyps are found in the distal colon and rectum. They have no malignant potential, which means that they are no more likely than normal tissue to eventually become a cancer.

Hyperplastic polyps on the right side of the colon do exhibit a malignant potential.  This occurs through multiple mutations that affect the DNA-mismatch-repair pathways.  As such DNA mutations during replication are not repaired.  This leads to microsatellite instability which can eventually lead to malignant transformation in polyps on the right side of the colon.

Serrated polyposis syndrome

Serrated polyposis syndrome is a rare condition that has been defined by the World Health Organization as either:
≥5 serrated lesions/polyps proximal to the rectum, all ≥ 5 mm in size, with two lesions ≥10 mm
>20 serrated lesions/polyps of any size distributed throughout the large bowel with 5 proximal to the rectum.

Histopathology
Histopathologically, there are two main types of hyperplastic polyps, which have genetic differences, as well as different histologic structure, but no significant differences clinically. The two main types of hyperplastic polyps are microvesicular mucin-rich type and goblet cell-rich type. A mucin-poor type with eosinophilic cytoplasm, which is rare, was previously described. However, the mucin poor type is no longer considered a distinct subtype.

Mucin-rich type
The luminal portion has a serrated ("saw tooth") appearance formed by tufts or folds of abundant apical cytoplasm. It contains glands with star-shaped lumina. There are crypts that are elongated but straight, narrow and hyperchromatic at the base. All crypts reach to the muscularis mucosae. The basement membrane is frequently thickened.

Goblet cell-rich type
Elongated, fat crypts and little to no serration. Therefore, they may not be obvious without comparing to adjacent normal intestinal wall.

They are filled with goblet cells, extending to surface, which commonly has a tufted appearance.

Epithelial misplacement
Infrequently, the epithelium is misplacement into the submucosa. Such polyps have been termed "inverted hyperplastic polyps". They appear to be restricted to the sigmoid colon and rectum. The misplaced epithelium is mucin-depleted, similar to the basal 1/3 of the polyp. The misplacement is accompanied by the lamina propria, and is continuous with overlying polyp through a gap in the muscularis mucosae. It may require slices at multiple levels to demonstrate microscopically.

In such cases adjacent hemorrhage and hemosiderin deposition is common. Collagen type IV stain will have a strong continuous staining around nests.

Cellular structure
Nuclei are small, regular, round and basal in the luminal half of the crypts, most reliably evaluated near the luminal surface.

There are proliferative changes at the base of crypts, where nuclei are enlarged, the nucleus/cytoplasm ratio is elevated.

Immunohistochemistry

CK20 is positive in the luminal  or  parts.

Differential diagnoses

The deep proliferative zones and reactive processes closely mimic changes seen in colorectal adenomas.

Features that distinguish a hyperplastic polyp from a tubular colorectal adenoma are as follows:

A sessile serrated adenoma or traditional serrated adenoma is suspected if there is either of the following:
 Nuclear stratification
 Loss of polarity
 Dysplasia

A sessile serrated adenoma is suspected in case of any of the following:
 Size ≥0.5 cm
 Location in right colon
If both are present, it is almost always an SSA. Other features causing a suspicion for sessile serrated adenoma are:
 Dilation of crypts
 Branching of crypts
 Horizontal glands at the base
 Mature mucinous cells at the base of crypts

References

Digestive system neoplasia
Large intestine
Anatomical pathology